The Diocese of Tivoli is a Latin Church ecclesiastical territory or diocese of the Catholic Church in Latium, Italy, which has existed since the 2nd century. In 2002 territory was added to it from the Territorial Abbey of Subiaco. The diocese is immediately exempt to the Holy See.

History

Tivoli was strongly fortified by Belisarius in the Gothic War, but almost destroyed by Totila in 540. After the Lombard invasion it was in the power of the Byzantines and formed part of the patrimony of St. Peter. It had a count, representing the emperor. In 916 Pope John X won a  victory there over the Saracens.

It rebelled at times against the popes, under Emperor Henry IV and Emperor Henry V, and against Pope Innocent II; at other times it fought against the Roman rebels, as under Pope Eugene III and Pope Adrian IV. In the 13th century the Senate of Rome succeeded (under Pope Innocent IV) in imposing a tribute on the city, and arrogated to itself the right of appointing a count to govern it in conjunction with the local consuls.

In the 14th century it sided with the Guelphs and strongly supported Pope Urban VI against Pope Clement VII. King Ladislaus of Naples was twice, and later Braccio da Montone once, repulsed from the city. But its strength was undermined by internal factions, in consequence of which Pope Pius II constructed the fortress which still exists. Pope Adrian VI withdrew it from the jurisdiction of the Roman Senate. In 1527 it was sacked by bands of the supporters of the emperor and the Colonna, important archives being destroyed during the attack. In 1547 it was again occupied by the Duke of Alba in a war against Pope Paul IV, and in 1744 by the Austrians.

Bishops

to 1000

Paulus (366) 
Florentinus (402 ca.) 
Candidus (465); 
Hucbertus (945)
Joannes (973)
Gualterus (993–1000),  under whom the feast of St. Lawrence, patron of the city, was instituted;

1000 to 1500
Benedictus (1029)
Adam (ca. 1061–1073)
Maifred (attested 1117) 
Cardinal Guido (1123–1154); during whose episcopacy the see of Tivoli belonged to the suburbicarian sees.
Otto (1155-1169), during whose episcopacy Pope Eugene III died at Tivoli (8 July 1153);
Giovanni da Gabenna O.P. (1320-1337);
Branca, O.P. (1337).
Giovanni de Cors, O.P. (1337–1342)
Nicolaus de Velletri (1342–1349).
Daniel (1349–1367).
Filippo Gezza de' Rufinis, O.P. (1367-1380),
Nicolas Cesari  (1427–) 
Fra Lorenzo, O.Min. (1450-1471), reformer of the clergy;
Angelo Lupo Mancini de Cavis (1471–1485)
Antonio de Grassis (1485–1491)
Evangelista de Marisstella de Sutrio (1491–1499).
Angelo Leonini  (1499–3 1509)   (Appointed Archbishop of Sassari)

1500 to 1700
Camillo Leonini  (1509–1513 Resigned) 
Francesco Soderini  (1513–1516 Appointed Cardinal-Bishop of Palestrina) 
 Camillo Leonini  (1518–1527 Died) 
 Marcantonio della Croce  (1528–1554 Resigned) 
 Giovanni Andrea della Croce  (1554–1595 Died) 
Domenico Toschi  (1595–1606 Resigned) 
Giovanni Battista Toschi  (1606–1621) (Appointed Bishop of Rieti) 
Bartolomeo Cesi (cardinal) (Cesa)  (1621–1621 Died) 
Marco Antonio Gozzadini  (1621–1623 Appointed Bishop of Faenza) 
Mario Orsini  (1624–1634 Died) 
Giulio Roma  (1634–1652 Died) restorer of the cathedral and founder of the seminary;
Marcello Santacroce  (1652–1674 Died)
Federico Sforza  (1675–1676 Died) 
Mario Alberizzi  (1676–1679 Resigned) 
Galeazzo Marescotti  (1679–1684 Resigned) 
Antonio Fonseca (bishop)  (1690–1728 Died)

1700 to 1900
Francesco Antonio Finy  (1728–1728 Resigned) 
Placido Pezzancheri, O. Cist.  (1728–1757 Died) 
Francesco Castellini  (1758–1763 Appointed Bishop of Rimini) 
Tommaso Galli  (1764–1765 Died) 
Giulio Matteo Natali  (1765–1782 Died) 
Barnaba Chiaramonti (Gregorio Chiaramonti), O.S.B.  (1782–1785)  (Appointed Bishop of Imola) 
Vincenzo Manni  (1785–1815 Died) 
Giovanni Battista a Santa Margarita Pietro Alessandro Banfi, O.C.D.  (1816–1817 Died) 
Giuseppe Crispino Mazzotti  (1818–1820)   (Appointed Bishop of Cervia) 
Francesco Canali  (1820–1827 Resigned) 
Francesco Pichi  (1827–1840 Resigned) 
Carlo Gigli  (1840–1880 Resigned) 
Placido Petacci  (1880–1885 Resigned) 
Celestino del Frate  (1885–1894)  (Appointed Archbishop of Camerino) 
Gulielmus Maria d'Ambrogi, O.E.S.A.  (1895–1895 Resigned) 
Pietro Monti  (1895–1902 Resigned)

since 1900
Prospero Scaccia  (1903–1909)   (Appointed Archbishop of Siena) 
Gabriele Vettori  (1910–1915)   (Appointed Bishop of Pistoia e Prato) 
Luigi Scarano  (1917–1931 Died) 
Domenico Della Vedova  (1933–1950 Retired) 
Luigi Faveri  (1950–1967 Died) 
Guglielmo Giaquinta  (1974–1987 Resigned) 
Lino Esterino Garavaglia, OFMCap (1987–1991)  (Appointed Bishop of Cesena-Sarsina) 
Pietro Garlato  (1991–2003 Retired) 
Giovanni Paolo Benotto (2003–2008) (Appointed Archbishop of Pisa) 
Mauro Parmeggiani (2008– )

References

Bibliography

Sources for lists of bishops

Studies

External links
Benigni, Umberto. "Tivoli." The Catholic Encyclopedia. Vol. 14. New York: Robert Appleton Company, 1912. Retrieved: 22 Aprii 2020.

Tivoli
Dioceses established in the 2nd century